The Report from Iron Mountain is a book published in 1967 (during the Johnson Administration) by Dial Press which puts itself forth as the report of a government panel. The book includes the claim it was authored by a Special Study Group of fifteen men whose identities were to remain secret and that it was not intended to be made public. It details the analyses of a government panel which concludes that war, or a credible substitute for war, is necessary if governments are to maintain power. The book was a New York Times bestseller and has been translated into fifteen languages.  Controversy still swirls over whether the book was a satiric hoax about think-tank logic and writing style or the product of a secret government panel. The document is a favorite among conspiracy theorists, who reject the statement made in 1972 by satirist Leonard Lewin that the book was a spoof and that he was its author.

Publishing history
The book was first published in 1967 by Dial Press, and went out of print in 1980. E. L. Doctorow, then an editor at Dial, and Dial president Richard Baron agreed with Lewin and Victor Navasky to list the book as nonfiction and to turn aside questions about its authenticity by citing the footnotes.

Liberty Lobby put out an edition c. 1990, claiming that it was a U.S. government document, and therefore inherently in the public domain; Lewin sued them for copyright infringement, which resulted in a settlement. According to The New York Times, "Neither side would reveal the full terms of the settlement, but Lewin received more than a thousand copies of the bootlegged version."

Likewise, an edition was brought out in 1993 by Buccaneer Books, a small publisher reprinting out of print political classics.  It is unclear whether this was authorized by the author.

In response to the bootleg editions, Simon & Schuster brought out a new hardcover edition in 1996 under their Free Press imprint, authorized by Lewin, with a new introduction by Navasky and afterword by Lewin both insisting the book was fictional and satire, and discussing the original controversy over the book and the more recent interest in it by conspiracy theorists.

A new paperback edition was published in 2008.

Contents 
According to the report, a 15-member panel, called the Special Study Group, was set up in 1963 to examine what problems would occur if the United States entered a state of lasting peace. They met at an underground nuclear bunker called Iron Mountain (as well as other, worldwide locations) and worked over the next two years. A member of the panel, one "John Doe", a professor at a college in the Midwest, decided to release the report to the public.

The heavily footnoted report concluded that peace was not in the interest of a stable society, that even if lasting peace "could be achieved, it would almost certainly not be in the best interests of society to achieve it." War was a part of the economy. Therefore, it was necessary to conceive a state of war for a stable economy. The government, the group theorized, would not exist without war, and nation states existed in order to wage war. War served the vital function of diverting collective aggression. They recommended "credible substitutes" and paying a "blood price" to emulate the economic functions of war. Prospective government-devised alternatives to war included reports of alien life-forms, the reintroduction of a "euphemized form" of slavery "consistent with modern technology and political processes", and - one deemed particularly promising in gaining the attention of the malleable masses - the threat of "gross pollution of the environment".

Reaction by Lyndon Johnson
U.S. News & World Report claimed in its November 20, 1967, issue to have confirmation of the reality of the report from an unnamed government official, who added that when President Johnson read the report, he 'hit the roof' and ordered it to be suppressed for all time.  Additionally, sources were said to have revealed that orders were sent to U.S. embassies, instructing them to emphasize that the book had no relation to U.S. Government policy.

Authenticity 

When it was first published, controversy surrounded the book over the question whether it was a hoax or real. In an article in the March 19, 1972 edition of The New York Times Book Review, Lewin said that he had written the book.

The book was listed in the Guinness Book of World Records as the "Most Successful Literary Hoax."  Some people claim that the book is genuine and has only been called a hoax as a means of damage control. Trans-Action devoted an issue to the debate over the book. Esquire magazine published a 28,000-word excerpt.

In a remembrance of E. L. Doctorow published in 2015 in The Nation, Victor Navasky asserted his involvement in creating Report from Iron Mountain, naming Leonard Lewin as the main writer with "input" from economist John Kenneth Galbraith, two editors of the satirical magazine Monocle (Marvin Kitman and Richard Lingeman) and himself.

Purported statements made by John Kenneth Galbraith in support of authenticity
On November 26, 1967, the report was reviewed in the book section of The Washington Post by Herschel McLandress, supposedly the pen name for Harvard professor John Kenneth Galbraith. McLandress wrote that he knew firsthand of the report's authenticity because he had been invited to participate in its creation; that although he was unable to be part of the official group, he was consulted from time to time and had been asked to keep the project secret; and that while he doubted the wisdom of letting the public know about the report, he agreed totally with its conclusions.

He wrote: "As I would put my personal repute behind the authenticity of this document, so would I testify to the validity of its conclusions.  My reservation relates only to the wisdom of releasing it to an obviously unconditioned public."

Six weeks later, in an Associated Press dispatch from London, Galbraith went even further and jokingly admitted that he was a member of the conspiracy.  The following day, Galbraith backed off.  When asked about his 'conspiracy' statement, he replied: "For the first time since Charles II The Times has been guilty of a misquotation... Nothing shakes my conviction that it was written by either Dean Rusk or Mrs. Clare Boothe Luce".

The original reporter reported the following six days later: "Misquoting seems to be a hazard to which Professor Galbraith is prone.  The latest edition of the Cambridge newspaper Varsity quotes the following (tape recorded) interchange:
Interviewer: 'Are you aware of the identity of the author of Report from Iron Mountain?'
Galbraith: 'I was in general a member of the conspiracy, but I was not the author.  I have always assumed that it was the man who wrote the foreword – Mr. Lewin'."

In an article published in New York in 2013, Victor Navasky asserted that Galbraith was indeed McLandress, and that he was "in on the hoax from the beginning."

See also 
Continuity of Operations
Military-industrial complex
Military Keynesianism
War economy

References

External links
Freedom From War: The United States Program (under the auspices of the UN) for General and Complete Disarmament in a Peaceful World
 Report From Iron Mountain, by Leonard Lewin
 "An explanation of the circumstances and motivation involved in the creation of the Report," by Victor Navasky (backup of web page on archive.org)
 A Debunking of the scene in JFK where the hoax is quoted by Kennedy Assassination researcher Dave Reitzes
 Article from the Museum of Hoaxes
 Commentary on "Report From Iron Mountain" taken from Ch. 24 of The Creature from Jekyll Island, by G. Edward Griffin (PDF)
 L. C. Lewin, Writer of Satire Of Government Plot, Dies at 82, The New York Times, January 30, 1999

1967 books
Satirical books
Literary forgeries
Opposition to United States involvement in the Vietnam War
Written fiction presented as fact
False documents
Conspiracy theories in the United States
Dial Press books